Pratulum pulchellum is a species of cockle, a marine bivalve mollusc in the family Cardiidae.

References
 Powell A. W. B., William Collins Publishers Ltd, Auckland 1979 

Cardiidae
Bivalves of New Zealand
Bivalves described in 1843
Taxa named by John Edward Gray